Herbihabitans rhizosphaerae is a bacterium from the genus Herbihabitans which has been isolated from rhizosphere soil from the plant Limonium sinense in Xinjiang, China.

References

Pseudonocardiales
Bacteria described in 2016
Monotypic bacteria genera